Sri Thammasokaraj (Thai language: พระเจ้าศรีธรรมโศกราช or sometimes called พระเจ้าศรีธรรมโศการาช; ?-1230) is the founder and first king of Nakhon Si Thammarat Kingdom or Ligor City which succeeded the Tambralinga kingdom.

History of Nakhon Si Thammarat
Year of death missing
1230 deaths
Founding monarchs